Nikita Josephine Parris (born 10 March 1994) is an English professional footballer who plays as a forward for Women's Super League club Manchester United and the England national team. She previously played for Division 1 Féminine club Olympique Lyonnais, Manchester City, Everton and Arsenal.

From 2018 to 2020, Parris held the record as all-time leading scorer in the Women's Super League. With Olympique Lyonnais, Parris has won the 2019–20 UEFA Women's Champions League, the 2020 Coupe de France Féminine (Women's French Cup), the 2019 Trophée des Championnes, and the 2019 Women's International Champions Cup. With Manchester City, she won the 2016 league title, the 2016 and 2018–19 Women's Super League Cup as well as the 2016–17 and 2018–19 Women's FA Cup.

For England, Parris helped the national team reach the semi-finals of the Euro 2017 and a fourth place finish at the 2019 FIFA Women's World Cup. Her six goals during World Cup qualification ranked first within UEFA nations and secured England's place at the top tournament. She helped England win its first-ever SheBelieves Cup in 2019.

Parris was named the FWA Women's Footballer of the Year in 2019. She was included in The Guardian list of The 100 Best Female Footballers In The World in 2018 and 2019.

Early life and education

Born in Toxteth, an inner city area of Liverpool, Parris was raised with her twin sister and two brothers by her mother, Jo, who worked three jobs to support the family.

Parris attended St. Patrick’s Primary School in Liverpool where she trained with the athletic team and dreamed of playing like Arsenal and Scottish international player Julie Fleeting. At age six, she began playing football with boys on a grass border near her home and continued playing with boys until she was sixteen. Every time her mother looked out, she would see Parris slide tackling the boys or them slide tackling her.

As a youth, Parris started her own football team: "I started a football team myself at the age of eleven because I wanted to have a women’s team in the local community. So, I gathered all my friends and family and everyone I knew... and we were successful. We won the league." Parris' sister and two cousins also played in the team, which was called Kingsley United.

Parris was a girlhood Liverpool FC supporter. Her mother often bought her the latest kit, and she would emulate her favourite players Michael Owen, Fernando Torres and Luis Suárez. At age ten, Parris was recruited by Mo Marley, head coach of Everton. At the time, Parris did not want to leave, but later joined Everton's Centre of Excellence at age 14.

Parris attended Bellerive FCJ Catholic College, but in September 2010 switched to Cardinal Heenan Catholic High School for her sixth form education, because it was a specialist sports college.
She earned a degree in sports development from Liverpool John Moores University.

Club career

Everton

Parris made her senior-team debut for Everton in May 2010 at the age of 16 in an away game against Arsenal, coming on as a second-half substitute. In August 2010 she played her second match during the qualifying tournament for the 2010–11 UEFA Women's Champions League. During a match against Borec on 7 August 2010 she scored a brace, helping Everton to a 10–0 win. Parris played in five matches for Everton during the 2010–11 UEFA Women's Champions League. The following year, she was named to Everton's squad for the inaugural season of the Women's Super League (FA WSL). She made three appearances during the 2011 FA WSL season.

During the 2012 FA WSL season, Parris played in 10 matches, starting five. The 2013 season marked the start of Parris' goalscoring prowess for Everton. She scored six goals in 11 games. She scored the game-winning goal in a 1–0 win over Notts County on 15 September. Her two goals against Liverpool on 12 September were Everton's only goals in the 4–2 loss. Everton finished in third place during the regular season with a  record.

Parris scored 11 goals in 19 games during the 2014 season, but Everton went winless in the league and were relegated to FA WSL 2. Following her 2014 performance, she was placed on the shortlist for the 2015 PFA Women's Young Player of the Year and was selected for the WSL Team of the Year.

Manchester City (loan)
Parris joined Manchester City on a season-long loan in January 2015, reuniting with former teammates Toni Duggan and Jill Scott, who had left Everton two seasons prior, as she thought she needed to play in WSL 1 to contend for a place on the senior England national team. Parris scored four goals in 13 matches. She scored her first goal — a game-winner — during a match against Sunderland when she headed in from a corner kick in the 17th minute. During a match against Liverpool, she scored an equaliser in the 54th minute, another header, this time off of Izzy Christiansen's free-kick. Manchester City finished in second place during the regular season with a  record.

Manchester City
Parris signed with Manchester City on a two-year contract in January 2016. During the 2016 FA WSL season, she scored one goal in 16 games. On 29 April, her game-winning goal in the 40th minute cemented the team's 2–0 win against Sunderland. City finished in first place during the regular season with a  record. She played in all three games of the final stages of the League Cup helping Manchester City clinch the 2016 title.

Parris made her UEFA Women's Champions League debut for Manchester City on 6 October 2016 during the team's 2–0 win over Zvezda-2005 Perm in the Round of 32 of the 2016–17 tournament. She competed in seven matches, helping Manchester City advance to the semi-finals where they were eliminated by Olympique Lyonnais. 
 
During the FA WSL Spring Series in early 2017, she scored three goals in the six games that she played. Manchester City finished in fifth place with a  record. She helped the club clinch the 2016–17 FA Women's Cup the same year. During the 2017–18 FA WSL season, she was a starting forward in 17 of the 18 games she played and scored 11 goals, ranking second in the league behind Ellen White of Birmingham City. During the team's 3–0 win against Sunderland on 28 January 2018, she scored twice in the first half securing Manchester City's win and top position in the league. She scored her second brace of the season against Liverpool on 11 February to lift Manchester City back into first place. In May, she scored a hat-trick against Yeovil Town. Manchester City finished in second place during the regular season with a  record and secured a berth to the 2018–19 UEFA Women's Champions League (their third consecutive qualification).

Parris competed with Manchester City in eight matches of the 2017–18 UEFA Women's Champions League. She scored four goals throughout the tournament, including two game-winners against Lillestrøm, and Linköpings FC. Parris helped Manchester City reach the semi-finals where they were narrowly defeated 0–1 (aggregate) by eventual champions, Olympique Lyonnais.

In November 2017, Parris signed a new contract with Manchester City through the end of the 2018–19 FA WSL season. During the 2018–19 season, Parris scored 19 goals in 19 games. She was the second-highest scorer in the league for the season, the highest all-time WSL goalscorer, and second in the all-time assists. Parris began her season goal scoring with a brace in Manchester City's 4–0 win against Everton on 20 September. She scored another brace during the team's 7–1 win against West Ham United. At age 24, she became the Women's Super League's all-time top goalscorer on 4 November 2018 after scoring a brace in the team's 3–0 win against Liverpool. Her 37 goals inched ahead of former Chelsea striker Eniola Aluko. Of the notable record Parris said, "it's an amazing feeling. For me to be so young and be top goalscorer with plenty of years left in me – it bodes well for the future and hopefully it will continue." She scored her fourth brace of the season during a 3–0 win against Brighton & Hove Albion on 27 January 2019, including a penalty kick in the third minute of the match. Parris notched a hat-trick in the first half of the team's 4–3 win against Reading. Manchester City finished in second place behind Arsenal with a  record. Parris' brace against Chelsea in the semi-final earned City a berth to the 2018–19 FA Women's League Cup Final where they defeated Arsenal in penalty kicks after a 0–0 draw and extra time. The same year, she helped Manchester City win the 2018–19 FA Women's Cup in front of 43,264 fans at Wembley Stadium.

Parris competed with Manchester City in the team's two 2018–19 UEFA Women's Champions League Round of 32 matches where they were defeated 1–3 (aggregate) by Atlético Madrid.

On 11 May 2019, Parris announced she would leave City at the end of the 2018–19 season. During her time at Manchester City, Parris made 127 appearances for the club, and scored 62 goals. Her 25 assists ranked second all-time in the league after Karen Carney with 35. In 2019, Parris was voted the Football Writers’ Association Women's Player of the Year. The striker helped Manchester City win two FA Cups in 2017 and 2019, two Continental Cups, a league title and two Champions League semi-finals.

Olympique Lyonnais
On 19 June 2019, Division 1 Féminine side Olympique Lyonnais confirmed they had signed Parris on a three-year contract. Parris scored her first league goal for the club, on her debut, in a 6–0 win against Marseille on 24 August. Parris' two goals in a 5–0 home win over Montpellier on 23 February were her last of the season as the 2019–20 Division 1 Féminine season was curtailed by the COVID-19 pandemic in France. In 15 league appearances and 10 starts, Parris scored eight goals. Olympique Lyonnais finished first in the league and secured a berth to the 2020–21 UEFA Women's Champions League. Parris added four goals in six 2019–20 UEFA Women's Champions League appearances, but missed the final through suspension after she was sent off in a fractious semi-final win over rivals Paris Saint-Germain. Olympique Lyonnais won the Champions League title for the fifth consecutive time after defeating VfL Wolfsburg 3–1 in the 2020 UEFA Women's Champions League Final. This marked Olympique Lyonnais' seventh Champions League title.

Parris scored her first goal of the 2020–21 Division 1 Féminine season in a 3–0 win against Reims on 11 September 2020. During a match against Soyaux on 13 November, she scored a double to lift Olympique Lyonnais to a 5–1 win. She scored 4 goals in 26 minutes against Issy lifting Olympique Lyonnais to a 9–0 win in December. Parris scored a double against Paris FC on 22 January 2021 increasing her goal tally of the season to eleven.

Arsenal
Following two seasons with Olympique Lyonnais, Parris returned to the Super League, signing with Arsenal for a club-record fee on 2 July 2021. She scored her first goal for the club on her 18 August debut versus Okzhetpes in the Champions League. She scored her 50th goal in the WSL in the match against Aston Villa on 1 May 2022.

Manchester United

On 6 August 2022 Parris was confirmed to have signed for WSL club Manchester United.

International career

England

On 4 June 2016, Parris made her senior international debut for England as a substitute in England's Euro 2017 qualifying victory over Serbia. She registered one assist as England won 7–0. Three days later, Parris once again came off the bench in the reverse fixture, this time scoring twice as England repeated the 7–0 scoreline.

On 27 June 2017, Parris scored her first goal in a major tournament, netting the winner in England's 2–1 final group stage win against Portugal at Euro 2017. Parris and her England teammates pointedly ran to celebrate with coach Mark Sampson after her goal in their next match against Russia. At the time Sampson was facing various allegations of unfair treatment and discrimination towards teammate Eniola Aluko. Aluko stated, "For the most together team in the world tonight's "message" only shows a level of disrespect that represents division and selfish action" and later spotlighted the lack of diversity in English women's football. Sampson was fired the day after the Russia game but later won a "significant" settlement when he brought an unfair dismissal case against The FA. In June 2020, against the backdrop of the Black Lives Matter movement, Parris changed her mind about the situation and apologised to Aluko in an open letter. She called the celebration with coach Sampson a "thoughtless action" that showed ignorance as well as a lack of empathy and understanding.

England finished at the top of Group D after being undefeated in all three matches. After England defeated France 1–0 in the quarter-final, the team was defeated 3–0 in the semi-final by eventual champion the Netherlands.

On 2 March 2019, Parris scored against the United States in a 2–2 draw at the 2019 SheBelieves Cup, a tournament England won for the first time. Her six goals ranked first in 2019 FIFA Women's World Cup qualification (UEFA) and helped secure a spot at the tournament later that year.

In 2019, Parris' spot on the England roster at the 2019 FIFA Women's World Cup was announced by David Beckham. Parris scored her first World Cup goal and England's first in the 2019 World Cup during their opening group game, a penalty in a 2–1 win over Scotland. She was named FIFA's Player of the Match. Parris also took a penalty in England's next game, the fourth consecutive World Cup match England had won a penalty in, but had it saved by Argentina goalkeeper Vanina Correa. England won 1–0. After Parris missed her second penalty in a 3–0 win over Norway in the quarter-final, England manager Phil Neville added: "She's missed two penalties and they have both been really good saves. She'll take the next one. She is our best penalty taker." However, when England were awarded yet another penalty in their 2–1 semi-final defeat by the United States, Neville demoted Parris from penalty-taking duties in favour of the captain Steph Houghton. Houghton's poorly-struck penalty was saved and England went on to finish the tournament in fourth place. On 29 August, Parris revived her penalty form by rescuing a 3–3 draw against Belgium in an international friendly. This was followed, five days later, by an assist for Georgia Stanway's opener in a 2–1 defeat to Norway.

In June 2022 Parris was included in the England squad which won the UEFA Women's Euro 2022.

Great Britain
On 27 May 2021, Parris was called up for her first Olympic Games, being selected for the Great Britain team for the 2020 Summer Olympics. Parris scored in a pre-tournament friendly against New Zealand, with the match ending 3–0. She appeared in all four of Great Britain's tournament games.

Career statistics

Club

International

International goals

Scores and results list England's goal tally first.

Honours
Manchester City
FA Women's Super League: 2016
FA Women's Cup: 2016–17, 2018–19
FA WSL Cup: 2016, 2018–19

Olympique Lyonnais
Division 1 Féminine: 2019–20
Coupe de France: 2019–20
Trophée des Championnes: 2019
UEFA Women's Champions League: 2019–20

England

UEFA Women's Championship: 2022
SheBelieves Cup: 2019
Arnold Clark Cup: 2022

Individual
FWA Women's Footballer of the Year: 2019
Freedom of the City of London (announced 1 August 2022)
Women's Super League: all-time leading scorer from 2018–20

Style of play

As a youth, Parris looked up to Arsenal and Scotland international, Julie Fleeting, who was known for scoring goals. Described by teammates as "down to earth" with "exceptional gifts framed by a fierce determination and a maturity", Parris is known for her wit, ability to learn quickly, and fast-moving feet.

Former England manager Phil Neville noted in 2019 that Parris is "world class". The Telegraph described her as "an exhilarating footballer, a pain to face on the pitch" and her style of play as "fast and clinical".

Gaffer described her greatest attribute as foresight and credited her for her "grounded, thoughtful and hungry" leadership qualities. Her sister, boxer Natasha Jonas, noted, "She will always try her best and give 100 percent. She will always come off that pitch with nothing left to give, so whatever happens you've just got to be proud of that."

Personal life
Parris is a younger sister of boxer Natasha Jonas. Her first name is sometimes shortened to "Keets". She is a practising Catholic and a former altar girl.

In 2020, Parris founded the NP17 Football Academy, which offers sports qualifications to students in Liverpool. She noted, "That community gave me life and gave me an opportunity – that's what I want to do for these girls. I want to give them an opportunity to be successful in whatever they choose. Within inner city areas, there's always good and bad. You've got to be in and around the right people." The academy, based at the City of Liverpool College, is supported by international sportswear company Puma, which donates sports equipment. Other partners include the Liverpool City Council and the City of Liverpool College.

The same year, Parris worked with England's The Football Association (FA) and seven fellow high-profile footballers, including Harry Kane and Tyrone Mings, to form a panel focused on increasing the number of black, Asian and minority ethnic people at senior levels within football. The expert panel "will be consulted over the development of the FA’s Leadership Diversity Code".

Parris is sponsored by multi-national finance company Visa and Puma. In June 2019, she was featured in a promotional video for Visa and the 2019 World Cup. Parris has been featured along with her national teammates in the EA Sports' FIFA video game series since FIFA 17, a year after women players were included in the game for the first time.

In June 2019, a large mural of Parris was unveiled on Liverpool's London Road. The same year, a Parris mural by Honduran artist Javier Espinal and local youth was unveiled at the Metropolitan Methodist Centre in Toxteth.

See also 
 List of UEFA Women's Championship goalscorers
 List of England women's international footballers
 List of FA WSL hat-tricks

Notes

References

Further reading
 Aluko, Eniola (2019), They Don't Teach This, Random House, 
 Caudwell, Jayne (2013), Women's Football in the UK: Continuing with Gender Analyses, Taylor & Francis, 
 Clarke, Gemma (2019), Soccerwomen: The Icons, Rebels, Stars, and Trailblazers Who Transformed the Beautiful Game, 
 Dunn, Carrie (2019), Pride of the Lionesses: The Changing Face of Women's Football in England, Pitch Publishing (Brighton) Limited, 
 Dunn, Carrie (2016), The Roar of the Lionesses: Women's Football in England, Pitch Publishing Limited, 
 Grainey, Timothy (2012), Beyond Bend It Like Beckham: The Global Phenomenon of Women's Soccer, University of Nebraska Press, 
 Stay, Shane (2019), The Women's World Cup 2019 Book: Everything You Need to Know About the Soccer World Cup, Books on Demand, 
 Theivam, Keiran and Jeff Kassouf (2019), The Making of the Women's World Cup: Defining stories from a sport’s coming of age, Little,

External links

 Profile at the Olympique Lyonnais website
 Profile at the Football Association website
 
 
 

1994 births
People from Toxteth
Women's Super League players
Manchester City W.F.C. players
Everton F.C. (women) players
Manchester United W.F.C. players
Footballers from Liverpool
English women's footballers
Living people
Women's association football forwards
England women's international footballers
England women's under-23 international footballers
Olympic footballers of Great Britain
Black British sportswomen
2019 FIFA Women's World Cup players
Footballers at the 2020 Summer Olympics
Olympique Lyonnais Féminin players
Division 1 Féminine players
Expatriate women's footballers in France
English Roman Catholics
Arsenal W.F.C. players
UEFA Women's Euro 2022 players
UEFA Women's Championship-winning players
UEFA Women's Euro 2017 players